Pyinoolwin Township (Pyin U Lwin Township, Maymyo Township) is a township in Pyinoolwin District, Mandalay Region of Burma (Mandalay).  The administrative seat is Pyin U Lwin.

Towns and villages
Pyinoolwin Township includes the following towns and villages:
 Anisakan (Aneesakan)
Kyuntapin
Pyintha
Thinkadon
Thon-daung-ywa-ma
Wetwin (Watwon)
Zeygon
Holeik/""holeik,maymyo,burma"

Notes

External links
"Maymyo Map" Maplandia.com

Townships of Mandalay Region